Shetley Creek is a stream in southeast Madison County in the U.S. state of Missouri. It is a tributary of the Upper Castor River.

Shetley Creek has the name of Caleb Shetley, the original owner of the site.

See also
List of rivers of Missouri

References

Rivers of Madison County, Missouri
Rivers of Missouri